In India, Kovilakam is the principal manor, estate or palace of a princely Kshatriya (Thampuran,Thampan,Thirumulpad Kshatriya) lineages of Kerala, India.  This is the residence, where all who have not succeeded to get Rajaship remain under the management of the eldest resident male or female member of that particular branch of the family.  In North Malabar region, this is pronounced as Kolom. (koilom , koilovm )(കോവിലോവം)

A chief princely lineage of Kerala consists of several Kovilakams representing different matrilineal branches of the same family from which the individual members could ascend to the status of Raja in accordance to their seniority in age within the lineage. The Kovilakam-residences are usually large beautiful manors or palaces with extensive wood work and  mural paintings in the traditional medieval Kerala architecture style. A Kovilakam was usually endowed with estates and properties (crown lands) sufficient to the maintenance of its constituent members. At the very moment when a member ascends to any dignity/station (stanam), he/she loses his residence in the Kovilakam and is usually brought up and lived apart  on the property set apart for his dignity/station (stanam). However there are instances when such members on ascending to a station have preferred to stay back in their Kovilakams of birth. It was not uncommon where in due to internal squabbles and manoeuvres within different Kovilakams of a ruling princely family, a certain Kovilakam(s) may usurp and centralize  the sole right to inherit the Rajaship and deprive the other Kovilakams within the princely lineage of its inheritance to the station of Raja.

Examples
The Kottayam Royal Princely State lineage of North Malabar had three branches; viz.: 
 Kizhakke Kovilakam (Eastern Palace)
 Thekke Kovilakam (Southern Palace)
 Patinjare Kovilakam (Western Palace)

 The Kadathanadu porlathiri swaroopam, purameri,Vadakara , Kozhikode, Kerala,India (Bharatham)

 Edavilathu Kovilakam (
 Ayancheri Kovilakam

Travancore a kovilakam 

Padmavavilasam kovilakam (Current situation,dont know still exists (Omce existed)

Maybe destroyed nowadays by greed,due to old etc

References

Culture of Kerala